Amasia, previously known as Hamasia, is a village in the Amasia Municipality of the Shirak Province of Armenia. It is located on the right bank of the Akhuryan River. The Statistical Committee of Armenia reported its population was 2,218 in 2010, up from 1,878 at the time of the 2001 census.

Etymology 
Amasia's name is traditionally considered to be derived from Amasia Haykazuni, a great-grandson of Hayk, the legendary progenitor of the Armenians.

History 
Historically, the area that Amasia is located in was a part of the canton of Ashotsk of the province of Gugark of the ancient Kingdom of Armenia. Approximately two kilometers to the northwest of the village is a ruined ancient fortress built in Cyclopean style that the villagers refer to as Chatin Dara, dated to approximately the 3–2 millennia BCE. Two kilometers to the west of the village is an abandoned settlement that the villagers call Kharabalar, which according to folk tradition was inhabited by Greeks. There are also a number of medieval Armenian churches in the area around the village. Most of the current inhabitants of Amasia and the nearby villages are descended from Armenians who came from Basen and Kars and other parts of Western Armenia starting from 1829, when Eastern Armenia was conquered by the Russian Empire. However, until the 1920s the core village of Amasia was populated almost entirely by Turkic-speaking Sunni Muslims (Qarapapaqs). According to the 1912 edition of the Caucasian Calendar reference book, 528 people, mainly Qarapapaqs, lived in Amasia, then located in the Kars Okrug of the Kars Oblast of the Russian Empire. By 1931, Armenians outnumbered the Turkic population, and eventually the village became exclusively Armenian-populated.

In 1893, the British explorer and author of a two volume work on Armenia, H. F. B. Lynch, visited the village. During Soviet times, Amasia was the capital of the Amasia District of Soviet Armenia. From 1951–1956 the village was officially known as Ghukasyan (or Ghukasyan Nerkin to distinguish it from Ashotsk, then also called Ghukasyan), after the Armenian Young Communist Ghukas Ghukasyan who died during the May Uprising. The modern-day enlarged rural community of Amasia encompasses eight nearby villages: Aregnadem, Gtashen, Voghji, Byurakn, Meghrashat, Hovtun, Bandivan, and Jradzor.

Climate

Population 
The population of the village since 1886 is as follows:

References 

Communities in Shirak Province
Populated places in Shirak Province